Harshaali Malhotra (born 3 June 2008) is an Indian actress and model who appears in Hindi-language films and television series.

Early life
Harshaali was born on 3 June 2008 in Mumbai, Maharashtra, India into a Punjabi Hindu family.

Career 
Malhotra made her film debut with a leading role in Kabir Khan's 2015 drama film Bajrangi Bhaijaan, alongside Salman Khan, Kareena Kapoor and Nawazuddin Siddiqui. She played the role of Shahida also known as 'Munni', a Pakistani Muslim girl. Her performance as a mute girl was critically praised and earned her the Filmfare Award for Best Female Debut nomination, making her the youngest person to be nominated in the category and won the Screen Award for Best Child Artist among several other awards and nominations. She also received the Bharat Ratna Dr. Ambedkar Award in 2022 for her performance in Bajrangi Bhaijaan.

She has acted in serials such as Qubool Hai (2014) and Laut Aao Trisha (2014).

Filmography

Films

Television

Awards and nominations

References

External links

 
 

2008 births
Living people
Indian Hindus
Punjabi people
Punjabi Hindus
Indian child actresses
Actresses from Mumbai
Zee Cine Awards winners